Impressions is an album of live and studio recordings by jazz musician John Coltrane, released by Impulse! Records in July 1963.

Music and recording
Tracks 1 and 3 were recorded live at the Village Vanguard in November 1961, during the same residency that produced the seminal "Live" at the Village Vanguard album, while tracks 2 and 4 were recorded at Van Gelder Studio, respectively on September 18, 1962 and April 29, 1963. Track 5, "Dear Old Stockholm," also recorded on April 29, 1963, did not appear on the original release, but appears on later reissues. The album was originally released in 1963 on the Impulse! label.

The studio tracks were performed by the classic Coltrane quartet (pianist McCoy Tyner, bassist Jimmy Garrison, and drummer Elvin Jones), who are joined by saxophonist Eric Dolphy and bassist Reggie Workman on the tracks recorded live at the Village Vanguard. Dolphy contributes a long bass clarinet solo on "India", but lays out on all but the final chord of "Impressions". Workman plays only on "India", joining Garrison in approximating the droning sound of Indian classical music.

Drummer Roy Haynes replaces Elvin Jones on "After the Rain" and "Dear Old Stockholm". The title track features nearly fifteen minutes of Coltrane's soloing.

The music reflects Coltrane's evolving emotional and musical range, where he explores jazz modality, the music of India, the blues, and a traditional Swedish folk song. The eclecticism is to be expected; the album amounts ultimately to a compilation of three years of oddments.

Reception
DownBeat magazine critic Harvey Pekar summed up the album in his five-star review of August 29, 1963 writing: "Not all the music on this album is excellent (which is what a five-star rating signifies,) but some is more than excellent."

Influence on popular music
According to Roger McGuinn, while touring in late 1965, the rock band the Byrds had only a single tape recording to listen to on the tour bus, with Ravi Shankar on one side and Coltrane's Impressions and Africa/Brass on the other: "We played that damn thing 50 or 100 times, through a Fender amplifier that was plugged into an alternator in the car." The result was the recording of the single "Eight Miles High", acknowledged by the band as a direct homage to Coltrane, and to "India" on Impressions in particular.

In 2000 it was voted number 687 in Colin Larkin's All Time Top 1000 Albums.

Track listing
All tracks composed by John Coltrane except where noted.

Personnel

Musicians
 John Coltrane – soprano and tenor saxophone
 Eric Dolphy – bass clarinet (track 1), alto sax (track 3, final chord only)
 McCoy Tyner – piano (tracks 1, 3, 4, and 5)
 Jimmy Garrison – double bass
 Reggie Workman – double bass (track 1)
 Elvin Jones – drums (tracks 1, 2, and 3)
 Roy Haynes – drums (tracks 4 and 5)

Production
 Bob Thiele – production
 Rudy Van Gelder – recording engineer
 Kevin Reeves – reissue mastering

References

1963 albums
John Coltrane albums
Impulse! Records albums
Albums produced by Bob Thiele
Albums recorded at the Village Vanguard
Albums recorded at Van Gelder Studio